Peter Lukas Bühlmann (born 12 April 1965 in Zürich) is a Swiss mathematician and statistician.

Biography
Bühlmann studied mathematics from 1985 at the ETH Zurich with Diplom in 1990 and doctorate in 1993. His thesis The Blockwise Bootstrap in Time Series and Empirical Processes was written under the supervision of Hans-Rudolf Künsch and Erwin Bolthausen. At the University of California, Berkeley, Bühlmann was from 1994 to 1995 a postdoctoral research fellow and from 1995 to 1997 Neyman Assistant Professor. At ETH Zurich he became assistant professor in 1997 and is a full professor from 2004 to the present. From 2013 to 2017 he chaired the Department of Mathematics.

His research deals with statistics, machine learning, and computational biology.

He is married and has four children. Bühlmann is a frequent mountaineer in the Alps.

Honors and awards 
Bühlmann is a Fellow of the Institute of Mathematical Statistics, of the  American Statistical Association, and Elected Member of the International Statistical Institute. He is an honorary doctor of the Catholic University of Louvain and a recipient of Guy Medal in Silver from the Royal Statistical Society (2018). He presented the Neyman Lecture from the Institute of Mathematical Statistics (2018), was Rothschild Fellow and Lecturer at the Isaac Newton Institute (2018), invited speaker at the International Congress of Mathematicians in Rio de Janeiro (2018) and a Plenary Speaker at the 8th European Congress of Mathematics in Portoroz (2021). From 2014-2020 he was a Highly Cited Researcher at Thomson Reuters/Clarivate Analytics. From 2010 to 2012 he was a co-editor of the Annals of Statistics.

Selected publications

Books
with Sara van de Geer: Statistics for high-dimensional data. Methods, Theory and Applications, Springer 2011
as editor with P. Drineas, M. Kane, M. van der Laan: Handbook of Big Data, Chapman and Hall 2016
as editor with others: Statistical Analysis for High-Dimensional Data. The Abel Symposium 2014, Springer 2016

Articles
with N. Meinshausen: High-dimensional graphs and variable selection with the lasso, Annals of Statistics, vol. 34, 2006, pp. 1436–1462, Arxiv
with N. Meinshausen: Stability selection, Journal of the Royal Statistical Society, Series B, vol. 72, 2010, pp. 417–473 
with L. Meier, S. Van de Geer: The group lasso for logistic regression, Journal of the Royal Statistical Society, Series B, vol. 70, 2008, pp. 53–71 
with A. Prelić et al.: A systematic comparison and evaluation of biclustering methods for gene expression data, Bioinformatics, vol. 22, 2006, pp. 1122–1129 
with B. Yu: Boosting with the L2 loss: regression and classification, Journal of the American Statistical Association, vol. 98, 2003, pp. 324–339 
with J. J. Goeman: Analyzing gene expression data in terms of gene sets: methodological issues, Bioinformatics, vol. 23, 2007, pp. 980–987 
with B. Yu: Analyzing bagging, Annals of Statistics, vol. 30, 2002, pp. 927–961 
with T. Hothorn: Boosting algorithms: Regularization, prediction and model fitting, Statistical Science, vol. 22, 2007, pp. 477–505 
with S. van de Geer: On the conditions used to prove oracle results for the Lasso, Electronic Journal of Statistics, vol. 3, 2009, pp. 1360–1392

References

1965 births
Living people
ETH Zurich alumni
Academic staff of ETH Zurich
Swiss mathematicians
Swiss statisticians
Annals of Statistics editors
Mathematical statisticians
Computational statisticians